Dilbar Hussain (born 20 February 1993) is a Pakistani cricketer. He made his Twenty20 debut on 25 January 2020, for the Melbourne Stars in the 2019–20 Big Bash League season. He was brought into the team's squad as a replacement for Haris Rauf, who was called up for international duty with Pakistan.

He was part of the Lahore Qalandars development squad after previously working on agricultural land in his village near Faisalabad. He impressed Qalandars coach Aaqib Javed in his first hard ball game in Faisalabad, Punjab in 2018 and toured Australia with the Qalandars development squad in the same year. He made his first-class debut on 31 October 2020, for Southern Punjab, in the 2020–21 Quaid-e-Azam Trophy.

Early life
Born in a village in the tehsil Jaranwala  of Faisalabad district, Punjab, Pakistan, he was working on agricultural land there before getting his first professional cricket contract.He is a boy of farmer and he belong to village 90chtii my class fellow are also from his village

References

External links
 

1993 births
Living people
Pakistani cricketers
Lahore Qalandars cricketers
Melbourne Stars cricketers
Cricketers from Faisalabad
Southern Punjab (Pakistan) cricketers